The Autonomous University of Campeche (in ) is a Mexican public university based in the city of Campeche, Campeche, that has several campuses across the state. It was founded in 1965 as the Universidad del Sudeste (University of the Southeast).

Its library holds over 18,000 volumes.

References

Autonomous University of Campeche
Educational institutions established in 1989
1989 establishments in Mexico
Campeche City